Civil War reenactment may refer to:
 American Civil War reenactment
 Renaissance reenactment
 The Sealed Knot (reenactment), UK